The men's Greco-Roman 66 kilograms is a competition featured at the 2002 World Wrestling Championships, and was held at the Universal Sports Hall CSKA in Moscow, Russia from 20 to 21 September 2002.

Results

Preliminary round

Pool 1

Pool 2

Pool 3

Pool 4

Pool 5

Pool 6

Pool 7

Pool 8

Pool 9

Pool 10

Pool 11

Knockout round

References

Men's Greco-Roman 66 kg